Fulnetby is a hamlet and civil parish in the West Lindsey district of Lincolnshire, England.

Once larger than the present day hamlet, Fulnetby is considered a deserted medieval village with earthworks in fields east of Fulnetby Hall known as Hall Garths, however since 1953 these have been destroyed and nothing can be seen today.

The deserted medieval village of Helethorpe or Halethorpe was located nearby and was documented from 1212 to 1711, of which only earthworks remain.

Formerly a chapel of ease to Rand, Fulnetby was created a civil parish in 1866 and enlarged by gaining part of Rand in 1887.

Fulnetby Hall is a Grade II listed building dating from the 16th century with a moat on its north and western side.

References

External links

Hamlets in Lincolnshire
Civil parishes in Lincolnshire
West Lindsey District